Khasiin Khulguud is a Mongolian football club from Ulaanbaatar, competing in the Mongolia Premier League.

Honours
 Mongolia Premier League: (1)
 Winner : 2006

References

Football clubs in Mongolia
2006 establishments in Mongolia